Trinidad gecko (Gonatodes humeralis) is a species of lizard in the Sphaerodactylidae family native to northern South America.

References

Gonatodes
Reptiles described in 1855